Poovam  is a small village in Taliparamba Block in Kannur district of Kerala State, India. It comes under Panniyoor Panchayat. Panniyoor Pepper Research centre is near to Poovam town, Poovam is located 30 km to the north of District headquarters Kannur. 8 km from Taliparamba. 507 km from State capital Thiruvananthapuram.

Poovam Pin code is 670142 and postal head office is Karimbam.

Taliparamba (8 km), Chengalai (9 km), Naduvil (10 km), Pattuvam (12 km), Mayyil (13 km) are the nearby villages to Poovam. Poovam is surrounded by Payyannur Block to the west, Irikkur Block to the east, Kannur Block to the south, Edakkad Block to the south.

Another village given this same name is in Changanassery taluk of Kottayam district,about 4.5 km from Changanassery. The most beautiful village was surrounded by water on all four sides.

References

Villages near Taliparamba